Daniel James "Diamond Dan" Beyer (born January 16, 1977) is an American radio presenter, usually heard doing half-hourly updates weekdays on Fox Sports Radio during Jay Mohr Sports. Beyer has been with Fox Sports Radio since 2005, after working at radio stations in Baraboo and Madison.

Beyer won "Sidekick of the Year" for Sports Fox Radio.

References

1977 births
Living people
People from Merrill, Wisconsin
University of Wisconsin–Madison alumni
Radio personalities from Wisconsin